The grey-head surgeonfish (Acanthurus nigros) is a species of fish in the family Acanthuridae. It was described by Albert Günther in 1861.

References

Acanthuridae
Fish described in 1861
Taxa named by Albert Günther